George Peabody Estey (1829–1881), also spelled Este, was a Union Army general during the American Civil War.

Biography
George P. Estey was born on April 25, 1829, in Nashua, New Hampshire. For some time he attended Dartmouth College, though he didn't graduate, and briefly moved to California and Illinois to study law before settling in Toledo, Ohio. There he practiced in partnership with future Chief Justice Morrison R. Waite.

When the Civil War began, he became lieutenant colonel of the 14th Ohio Infantry Regiment, a three-months unit that eventually reorganized for three years of service. With his men he fought in the Western Virginia Campaign and in Kentucky before being promoted to colonel, again serving in the Tullahoma Campaign. By the time of the Atlanta Campaign he commanded a brigade of the XIV Corps. He received a leg wound while leading a bayonet charge at the Battle of Jonesborough, receiving praise from division commander Absalom Baird. During the Savannah Campaign, on December 9, 1964, he was brevetted brigadier general. He then participated in the Carolinas Campaign. On June 26, 1865, he was appointed full brigadier general, the confirmation by Congress coming just in 1866 after he had resigned in December.

After the war he returned to practicing law in Washington, D.C., for the remainder of his life. He died from pneumonia in Manhattan, New York, on February 6, 1881, and was interred at his birthplace.

See also
List of American Civil War generals (Union)

References

Sources

External links

1829 births
1881 deaths
19th-century American lawyers
Dartmouth College alumni
People of New Hampshire in the American Civil War
People of Ohio in the American Civil War
Union Army generals
Deaths from pneumonia in New York City